Lieutenant-General Sir Henry Le Guay Geary  (29 April 1837 – 31 July 1918) was a British Army officer.

Geary was the son of Frederick August Greary and Anne Soulsby. He was educated at the Royal Military Academy, Woolwich and commissioned into the Royal Artillery. He served in the Crimean War and was awarded the Order of the Medjidie (5th class) for distinguished conduct in the field. He subsequently served in the Indian Rebellion of 1857 and the British Expedition to Abyssinia. He held appointments in Ireland, at the Army Headquarters and the War Office before serving as President of Ordnance Committee from 1899 to 1902. In 1900 he was appointed a Knight Commander of the Order of the Bath. Geary was Governor and military Commander-in-Chief of the Imperial fortress colony of Bermuda between 1902 and 1904, which included control of the large Bermuda Garrison.

References

1837 births
1918 deaths
British Army lieutenant generals
British Army personnel of the Crimean War
British military personnel of the Indian Rebellion of 1857
Governors of Bermuda
Graduates of the Royal Military Academy, Woolwich
Knights Commander of the Order of the Bath
Royal Artillery officers